Leo Mikić (born 6 May 1997) is a Croatian professional footballer who plays as a right midfielder for Austrian Bundesliga club SV Ried.

Career
Born in Požega, Mikic played with the youth team of Dinamo Zagreb, and after spells with several other clubs, started his senior career at NK Slavija Pleternica in the Treća HNL. He joined Austrian club FC Lustenau 07 in the fifth-tier Austrian 2. Landesliga in 2018, after being scouted by a player he played against. From March until the end of the season, Mikic scored 10 goals in 13 appearances. After scoring 28 goals in 30 league matches across the 2018–19 season as Kapfenberg won their division, he signed for 2. Liga club Kapfenberger SV on a one-year contract with an option to extend in summer 2019. After 2 years at Kapfenburg, in which he scored 9 goals in 44 matches, he joined Austrian Football Bundesliga club SV Ried in summer 2021. He scored 5 goals in 29 matches in his debut season in the division.

References

External links
 

1997 births
Living people
People from Požega, Croatia
Association football wingers
Association football forwards
Croatian footballers
FC Lustenau players
Kapfenberger SV players
SV Ried players
Second Football League (Croatia) players
Austrian 2. Landesliga players
2. Liga (Austria) players
Austrian Football Bundesliga players
Croatian expatriate footballers
Expatriate footballers in Austria
Croatian expatriate sportspeople in Austria